Senator Deyo may refer to:

Abraham A. Deyo (1793–1873), New York State Senate
Martin W. Deyo (1902–1951), New York State Senate